Mehmet Sarper Kıskaç (born July 9, 1990 in Kadıköy, Turkey) is a Turkish football player.

Career
He played central defender for Standard Liège in the Jupiler League and MKE Ankaragücü. On 31 August 2010 announced his re-sign with Standard Liège and joined to local rival RFC de Liège.

References

1990 births
Living people
People from Kadıköy
Turkish footballers
Turkey youth international footballers
Footballers from Istanbul

Association football defenders